Solasiramani is a village located in Namakkal district, Tamil Nadu, India.

The village is located on the banks of river Kaveri and agriculture and allied activities are the professions of the people here. The village has not suffered any drought as it is located on the river banks. Bore well and tank irrigation supplement the agriculture in summer and dry seasons. Sugarcane, Turmeric, Coconut and Rice are the major cultivation in this village. The major government banks located in this village are Primary Agricultural Credit Co-operative Society, Post Office.etc.A Veterinary Dispensary of the Tamil Nadu Government is also there to cater the livestock of farmers. There is one government elementary and one government high schools are located in this village.

There is a barrage on the river kaveri which generates Hydel power during water flow in the river.

Postal PIN Code of the village is 637210

Temples

Angalaparameswari Amman
A 500 year old temple.

References

Villages in Namakkal district